WQKR (1270 AM, "Portland's Radio Station") is a radio station broadcasting a classic hits music format. Licensed to Portland, Tennessee, United States, the station is currently owned by Venture Broadcasting LLC and features programming from Citadel Media and Talk Radio Network.  Studios are located on Main Street with its transmitter located on Shady Park Road in Robertson County adjacent to Interstate 65.

References

External links

QKR
Classic hits radio stations in the United States
Sumner County, Tennessee
Radio stations established in 1993
1993 establishments in Tennessee